Clearbury Ring is a univallate Iron Age hillfort which is partly in the parish of Downton in the county of Wiltshire in southwest England, approximately  due south of Salisbury city centre. The site, which is a Scheduled Ancient Monument, straddles the boundary with Odstock parish, and a slight scarp runs across the interior of the fort, marking the parish boundary.

The hillfort is immediately adjacent to the Clearbury Down Site of Special Scientific Interest, but is not included within it.

Traces of a quarry are evident within the fort's interior. The fort is overgrown with tree cover. In 1632, Clearbury Ring was recorded as Clereburu. A paleolithic hand axe was found here.

Two other lynchets have been identified near the fort, although they are not as well-preserved, together with faint traces of ancient field boundaries.

References

External links
 

Hill forts in Wiltshire
Iron Age sites in England
Scheduled monuments in Wiltshire